The following list of tallest buildings in Suzhou ranks skyscrapers in the Chinese city of Suzhou, Jiangsu by height. The tallest building in Suzhou is currently Suzhou IFS and is 450 meters tall. Most skyscrapers in Suzhou are clustered around the Suzhou Industrial Park area. This list ranks skyscrapers in Suzhou that stand at least 180 m tall, based on standard height measurement.

Tallest Completed Buildings

Under Construction

This lists buildings that are under construction in Suzhou and are planned to rise at least 180 m (590 feet). Buildings that have already been topped out are not included.

References

Buildings and structures in Suzhou
Suzhou